Phillip Chancellor may refer to the following fictional characters from The Young and the Restless:

 Phillip Chancellor II
 Phillip Chancellor III
 Phillip Chancellor IV

See also
Philip the Chancellor